Dieter Pauly (born 14 February 1942 in Rheydt) is a retired German football referee. He refereed the Bucharest leg of the Liverpool vs Dinamo Bucharest, 1984 European Cup Semi-Final and a match in the UEFA Euro 1988 on home soil in West Germany.

References

External links
 Profile at worldfootball.net

1942 births
Living people
Sportspeople from Mönchengladbach
German football referees
UEFA Euro 1988 referees